Ayu-mi-x 7 (stylized as ayu-mi-x 7) is a series of remix albums by Japanese musician Ayumi Hamasaki, served as the seventh installments to the parent release Ayu-mi-x. The albums were originally scheduled to be released on March 30, but it was postponed due to the 2011 Tohoku earthquake and tsunami and were released on April 20. A limited box set contains all versions along with a bonus disc were also released on the same day.

Release
Ayu-mi-x 7: Limited Complete Box Set (stylized as ayu-mi-x 7 -LIMITED COMPLETE BOX-) contains all versions along with a special non-stop megamix bonus disc made with selected remixes from four albums and 13 LP-sized posters of her previous Ayu-mi-x covers.

All albums contains the remixes of Ayumi's each 50 singles

Track listings

Bonus CD: Non-stop Megamix
 Vogue (Groove Coverage Remix)
 Far Away (Alex M.O.R.P.H. Extended rmx)
 Seasons (John O'Callaghan Remix)
 Step You (Morris Capaldi versus Ayumi Hamasaki RMX)
 Surreal (Dima Euro Remix 2011)
 Sunrise (Love is All) (Accatino - Rimonti - Festari Remix)
 Fairyland (Hex Hector Remix)
 To Be (Jonathan Peters Club Mix)
 Whatever (Arranged by CMJK)
 Trust (Arranged by Akimitsu Homma)
 Audience (Arranged by Akimitsu Homma)
 Depend on You (Eurobeat GoGo's remix)
 Glitter (AKBK "DJ Command" Remix)
 Monochrome (Remo-Con Classic Trance Remix)
 Moon (Clokx Remix)
 Crossroad (Johnny Vicious Club Mix)
 For My Dear... (House Nation Remix)
 Dearest (Razor 'N Guido Club Mix)
 Hanabi (Arranged by Shingo Kobayashi)
 Moments (Arranged by Akimitsu Homma)

Notes
 – denotes an additional arranger
 – denotes an original and additional arranger
 – denotes a remixer
 – denotes a producer and a remixer

Charts

Ayu-mi-x 7 Version House

Ayu-mi-x 7 Version Acoustic Orchestra

Ayu-mi-x 7 Presents Ayu Trance 4

Ayu-mi-x 7 Presents Ayu-ro Mix 4

References

External links
 Ayumi Hamasaki's official website 
 TeamAyu (official fansite)

Ayumi Hamasaki remix albums
2011 remix albums